Æthelred (floruit c. 875) was King of East Anglia.

No textual evidence of his reign is known, but numismatic evidence points to his reign being in the 870s, perhaps together with Oswald of East Anglia, whose coins are known from the same period.

References
 Kirby, D.P., The Earliest English Kings. London: Unwin Hyman, 1991.

External links
 

East Anglian monarchs
9th-century English monarchs